Roi or Roy may refer to:

People 
 Adenes Le Roi (c. 1240–c. 1300), French minstrel
 Roi Cohen Kadosh (born 1976), Israeli-British cognitive neuroscientist 
 Roi Huber (born 1997), Israeli basketball player
 Roi Kahat (born 1992), Israeli footballer
 Roi Klein (1975–2006), major in the Israeli Defense Forces
 Roi Kwabena (1956–2008), Trinidadian cultural anthropologist and writer
 Roi Méndez (born 1993), Spanish singer
 Vincent Roi Ottley (1906—1960), African-American journalist and writer
 Roi Partridge (1888–1984), American printmaker and teacher
 Rói Patursson (born 1947), Faroese writer and philosopher
 Roi Wilson (1921–2009), Royal Navy aviator
 Alice Roi (born 1976), American fashion designer
 "Le Roi" (French for "the King"), a nickname for French retired basketball player Antoine Rigaudeau (born 1971)
 Qin Fen (born 1991), Chinese singer, also known as Roi

Places
 Republic of Iceland, an island nation in the North Atlantic
 Republic of India, a country in South Asia
 Republic of Indonesia, a country and group of islands in Southeast Asia 
 Republic of Ireland, a country in north-western Europe
 Ro'i, an Israeli settlement in the West Bank
 Roi, Lhünzê County, a village in Tibet
 Roi-Namur, in the Marshall Islands, previously the two separate islands Roi and Namur, now joined by landfill

Songs
 "Roi" (song), a 2019 song by Bilal Hassani
 "Roi", a 1993 song in the album Last Splash by The Breeders

Other uses 
 , a US World War II aircraft carrier
 Roi, the Hawaiian name for Cephalopholis argus, the Blue-Spotted Grouper
 Region of interest, of samples in a dataset
 Release of Information department in hospitals
 Return on investment
 Royal Institute of Oil Painters

See also 
 El Roi, one of the names of God in the Hebrew Bible
 Cú Roí, a king of Munster in Irish mythology
 Roi Mata, a powerful 13th century Melanesian chief from what is now Vanuatu
 Roy (disambiguation)